Stumpffia gimmeli is a species of frog in the family Microhylidae. It is endemic to Madagascar. Its natural habitats are subtropical or tropical moist lowland forests, plantations, and heavily degraded former forest. This species is adaptable and can tolerate some effects of deforestation, becoming abundant in some areas.

References

Stumpffia
Amphibians described in 1992
Endemic frogs of Madagascar
Taxonomy articles created by Polbot